Nemesia is a genus of annuals, perennials and sub-shrubs which are native to sandy coasts or disturbed ground in South Africa. Numerous hybrids have been selected, and the annual cultivars are popular with gardeners as bedding plants. In temperate regions they are usually treated as half-hardy, grown from seed in heat, and planted out after all danger of frost has passed.

The flowers are two-lipped, with the upper lip consisting of four lobes and the lower lip two lobes.

The following cultivars have gained the Royal Horticultural Society’s Award of Garden Merit:- 

 = ‘Penblue’ 
‘Innocence’ 
 = ‘Fleuron’
Nemesia denticulata

Species
Species include:

See also
List of Nemesia cultivars

References

 
Scrophulariaceae genera
Flora of Africa